Dame Margaret June Sparrow  (née Muir, born 25 June 1935) is a New Zealand medical doctor, reproductive rights advocate, and author.

Early life, family, and education
Sparrow was born in Inglewood on 25 June 1935 to Daniel James Muir and Jessie Isobel Muir (née McMillan), and was educated at Waitara District High School and New Plymouth Girls' High School. She went on to study at Victoria University College from 1953 to 1955, graduating BSc; the University of Otago from 1957 to 1963, from where she graduated MB ChB; and the University of London, where she completed a Diploma in Venereology in 1976.

In 1956, she married Peter Charles Methven Sparrow, and the couple went on to have two children. Peter Sparrow died in 1982.

Career
Sparrow started her career in health working at the student health centre at Victoria University of Wellington in the late 1960s. At the time, the clinic would only allow contraception to be given to married couples, and she had to go against the wishes of the director of the clinic to put up an information display about contraception.

While working at the clinic, student demand for contraception led to her introducing the morning-after pill and helping students to get abortions. She worked as a medical officer at Student Health until 1981. Between 1977 and 1999 she worked as a visiting venereologist at Wellington Hospital.

Sparrow was the president of the Abortion Law Reform Association of New Zealand from 1975 to 1980, and again from 1984 until 2011.

She is a Director of Istar Ltd, a not-for-profit company that imports the abortion pill mifepristone from France. The pill was approved for use in 2001, and allowed women to have medical — rather than surgical — abortions for the first time. No other pharmaceutical company was interested in importing the drug.

Views
In 2015, Sparrow stated that New Zealand's abortion law was out of date and should be reformed:

She is also critical of the way the current abortion system forces women to claim they need abortions on the grounds of a danger to mental health:

Honours and awards
In the 1987 Queen's Birthday Honours, Sparrow was appointed a Member of the Order of the British Empire, for services to medicine and the community, and in 1993 she was awarded the New Zealand Suffrage Centennial Medal. In the 2002 Queen's Birthday and Golden Jubilee Honours, she was appointed a Distinguished Companion of the New Zealand Order of Merit, for services to medicine and the community, and in 2009 she accepted redesignation as a Dame Companion of the New Zealand Order of Merit following the restoration of titular honours by the New Zealand government.

The family planning clinic in Wellington is named after Sparrow. Sparrow was a keen collector of contraceptive devices, which were later donated to the Museum of New Zealand Te Papa Tongarewa. In 2015–16, Te Papa used them as the core of an exhibition on contraception.

Publications
 Sparrow, Abortion Then & Now: New Zealand Abortion Stories From 1940 to 1980 (Wellington: Victoria University Press, 2010);  
 Sparrow, Rough on Women: Abortion in Nineteenth Century New Zealand (Wellington, VUP, 2014); 
 Sparrow, "Risking their Lives: NZ Abortion Stories 1900-1939" (Wellington: Victoria University Press, 2017);

See also
Abortion in New Zealand

References

External links
Profile on the New Zealand Family Planning website
Profile on the Capital and Coast District Health Board website
Interview on Radio New Zealand National with Wallace Chapman

Living people
Reproductive rights activists
People from Inglewood, New Zealand
Dames Companion of the New Zealand Order of Merit
Victoria University of Wellington alumni
Recipients of the New Zealand Suffrage Centennial Medal 1993
New Zealand Members of the Order of the British Empire
University of Otago alumni
Alumni of the University of London
New Zealand abortion-rights activists
New Zealand women medical doctors
People educated at New Plymouth Girls' High School
People educated at Waitara High School
1935 births
Members of district health boards in New Zealand